The following lists events in the year 2018 in Saudi Arabia.

Incumbents
Monarch: Salman
Crown Prince: Mohammad bin Salman

Events

January
12 January - Women were allowed to gather at a football game for the first time due to easing of the strict gender separation rules.
24 January - Dozens of camels were disqualified from a beauty pageant near the capital of Riyadh following reports about injections of botox to make camels more attractive.

March
 26 March - The Houthis launch a barrage of rockets at Saudi Arabia, killing an Egyptian man and leaving two others wounded in Riyadh.

June
21 June – According to analyst OPEC will keep oil price goes on higher, Ajay Rajadhyaksha and Michael Gavin both said, “lack of consensus on any output increase”, “even if Russia and Saudi Arabia raise output unilaterally, it would leave OPEC’s spare capacity cushion thin by historical standards".
24 June – The Saudi Arabian government lifts the ban on women driving, which is the country's most progressive form of women's rights to date.

Deaths

23 January – Mohammed Al-Mfarah, actor (b. 1945).
2 October – Jamal Khashoggi, journalist (b. 1958).

27 November – Sultan Al-Bargan, football player (b. 1983).
22 December – Talal bin Abdulaziz Al Saud, Prince (b. 1931).

References

 
2010s in Saudi Arabia
Years of the 21st century in Saudi Arabia
Saudi Arabia
Saudi Arabia